Ji Sung-hwan (지성환, born 10 November 1971) is a South Korean former cyclist. He competed in the team pursuit at the 1992 Summer Olympics.

References

External links
 

1971 births
Living people
South Korean male cyclists
Olympic cyclists of South Korea
Cyclists at the 1992 Summer Olympics
Place of birth missing (living people)
Asian Games medalists in cycling
Asian Games gold medalists for South Korea
Cyclists at the 1994 Asian Games
Cyclists at the 1998 Asian Games
Medalists at the 1994 Asian Games
Medalists at the 1998 Asian Games